Youssouf Djibaba (born 4 October 1976) is a French former professional boxer who competed from 1998 to 2007.

Professional career
On 25 February 2006, Djibaba fought Kevin Mitchell for the IBF Inter-Continental Super Featherweight title, but lost by twelfth-round unanimous decision.

Djibaba lost to Vitali Tajbert on 7 December 2007 by tenth-round knockout. Following the loss, Djibaba retired from boxing.

Professional boxing record 

|-
| style="text-align:center;" colspan="8"|15 Wins (3 knockouts, 12 decisions), 13 Losses, 2 Draws
|-  style="text-align:center; background:#e3e3e3;"
|  style="border-style:none none solid solid; "|Res.
|  style="border-style:none none solid solid; "|Record
|  style="border-style:none none solid solid; "|Opponent
|  style="border-style:none none solid solid; "|Type
|  style="border-style:none none solid solid; "|Round, Time
|  style="border-style:none none solid solid; "|Date
|  style="border-style:none none solid solid; "|Location
|  style="border-style:none none solid solid; "|Notes
|- align=center
|Loss||15–13–2||align=left| Vitali Tajbert
|
|
|
|align=left|
|align=left|
|- align=center
|Loss||15–12–2||align=left| Mohammed Medjadji
|
|
|
|align=left|
|align=left|
|- align=center
|Loss||15–11–2||align=left| Karim Chakim
|
|
|
|align=left|
|align=left|
|- align=center
|Loss||15–10–2||align=left| Mohammed Medjadji
|
|
|
|align=left|
|align=left|
|- align=center
|Win||15–9–2||align=left| Alessandro Di Meco
|
|
|
|align=left|
|align=left|
|- align=center
|Loss||14–9–2||align=left| Kevin Mitchell
|
|
|
|align=left|
|align=left|
|- align=center
|Loss||14–8–2||align=left| Petr Petrov
|
|
|
|align=left|
|align=left|
|- align=center
|Win||14–7–2||align=left| Mohamed Benbiou
|
|
|
|align=left|
|align=left|
|- align=center
|Win||13–7–2||align=left| Tarik Sahibeddine
|
|
|
|align=left|
|align=left|
|- align=center
|Win||12–7–2||align=left| Ali Oubaali
|
|
|
|align=left|
|align=left|
|- align=center
|Loss||11–7–2||align=left| Willie Limond
|
|
|
|align=left|
|align=left|
|- align=center
|Win||11–6–2||align=left| Bouziane Oudji
|
|
|
|align=left|
|align=left|
|- align=center
|Win||10–6–2||align=left| Adolphe Avadja
|
|
|
|align=left|
|align=left|
|- align=center
|Win||9–6–2||align=left| Bouziane Oudji
|
|
|
|align=left|
|align=left|
|- align=center
|Loss||8–6–2||align=left| Affif Djelti
|
|
|
|align=left|
|align=left|
|- align=center
|Win||8–5–2||align=left| Adolphe Avadja
|
|
|
|align=left|
|align=left|
|- align=center
|Loss||7–5–2||align=left| Matt Zegan
|
|
|
|align=left|
|align=left|
|- align=center
|Loss||7–4–2||align=left| Bouziane Oudji
|
|
|
|align=left|
|align=left|
|- align=center
|Win||7–3–2||align=left| Nasser Lakrib
|
|
|
|align=left|
|align=left|
|- align=center
|Loss||6–3–2||align=left| Nasser Lakrib
|
|
|
|align=left|
|align=left|
|- align=center
|style="background: #B0C4DE"|Draw||6–2–2||align=left| Abdelilah Touil
|
|
|
|align=left|
|align=left|
|- align=center
|Loss||6–2–1||align=left| Nasser Lakrib
|
|
|
|align=left|
|align=left|
|- align=center
|Loss||6–1–1||align=left| Mehdi Labdouni
|
|
|
|align=left|
|align=left|
|- align=center
|Win||6–0–1||align=left| Kimoun Kouassi
|
|
|
|align=left|
|align=left|
|- align=center
|Win||5–0–1||align=left| Frederic Bonifai
|
|
|
|align=left|
|align=left|
|- align=center
|style="background: #B0C4DE"|Draw||4–0–1||align=left| Jean Pierre Dibateza
|
|
|
|align=left|
|align=left|
|- align=center
|Win||4–0||align=left| Didier Tual
|
|
|
|align=left|
|align=left|
|- align=center
|Win||3–0||align=left| Djamel Ayed
|
|
|
|align=left|
|align=left|
|- align=center
|Win||2–0||align=left| Didier Tual
|
|
|
|align=left|
|align=left|
|- align=center
|Win||1–0||align=left| Johny Begue
|
|
|
|align=left|
|align=left|

References

External links
 

1976 births
Living people
Lightweight boxers
Super-featherweight boxers
French male boxers
Sportspeople from Marseille